Saint-Christophe-Vallon is a commune in the Aveyron department in southern France. Saint-Christophe station has rail connections to Brive-la-Gaillarde, Figeac and Rodez.

Population

See also
Communes of the Aveyron department

References

Communes of Aveyron
Aveyron communes articles needing translation from French Wikipedia